This is a list of vehicles designed or produced by AvtoVAZ, a Russian carmaker best known under its Lada brand.

Current models

 Lada 4x4  (Lada Niva/VAZ-2121) - off-road vehicle
Lada 4x4 3-door
Lada 4x4 5-door
Lada Niva Urban 4x4 3-door
Lada Niva Urban 4x4 5-door
 Lada Granta - subcompact car developed in collaboration with Renault and based on the Lada Kalina
Lada Granta sedan
Lada Granta liftback
Lada Granta Sport
Lada Granta Hatchback
Lada Granta SW
Lada Granta Cross
 Lada Largus - family car based on the Dacia Logan MCV
Lada Largus 5 Seater
Lada Largus 7 Seater
Lada Largus Cross 5 Seater
Lada Largus Cross 7 Seater
Lada Largus Commercial
 Lada Vesta - subcompact car developed in collaboration with Renault and designed by Steve Mattin
Lada Vesta sedan
Lada Vesta SW
Lada Vesta Cross
 Lada XRAY - Cross SUV
 Lada Niva (Chevrolet Niva/VAZ-2123) - off-road vehicle based on the original VAZ 2121 engine, transmission and most mechanicals of the original Lada Niva/Lada 4x4.

Historic models 
Lada 1200/1300 - VAZ-2101 sold in the West from the 1970s (e.g. 1974 for the UK)
Lada 1500 - VAZ-2103  sold into Western markets from the mid 1970s
 Lada Samara (VAZ-2108/2109/21099)
Lada Samara hatchback 3-doors (VAZ-2108)
Lada Samara hatchback 5-doors (Vaz-2109)
Lada Samara sedan (VAZ-2115)  (Vaz-21099)
Lada 110 (VAZ-2110/2111/2112) - compact car (Bogdan continues to produce this car as the Bogdan 2110/2111/2112 for the Ukrainian market)
Lada 110 sedan
Lada 111 wagon
Lada 112 hatchback
Lada 124 wagon
 Lada Kalina - supermini car
Lada Kalina sedan
Lada Kalina wagon
Lada Kalina hatchback
Lada Kalina sport
 Lada Priora (VAZ-2170/2171/2172) - compact car Series production of the Priora ceased in 2018. 
Lada Priora sedan
Lada Priora hatchback
Lada Priora wagon
Lada Priora coupé
 Lada Samara 2 (VAZ-2113/2114) - economy car
Lada Samara hatchback 3-doors
Lada Samara hatchback 5-doors
Lada Samara sedan (VAZ-2115)
Lada Riva (aka Lada Classic) (VAZ-2105/2104/2107) - medium-sized family car based on the original Fiat 124
Lada Classic 2105 - base sedan
Lada Classic 2104 - wagon version of the 2105 
Lada Classic 2107 - deluxe version identified by the large chromed grille

Oka 
The Oka is a Russian city car designed by AvtoVAZ and sometimes branded as a Lada. This model was also produced in Russia by SeverstalAvto and SeAZ (the Serpuhov Car Factory), as well as in Azerbaijan by the Gyandzha Auto Plant. Series production of the Oka ceased in 2008.

Racing, experimental or future models

Index designations

Each model has an internal index that reflects the level of modifications, based on the engine and other options installed. For example, the VAZ-21103 variant has the 1.5 L 16V engine, while the VAZ-21104 uses the latest 1.6 L 16V fuel injection engine.   Since 2001, trim levels are also indicated by including a number after the main index: '-00' means base trim level, '-01' means standard trim and '-02' designates deluxe version; for example, VAZ-21121-02 means Lada 112 hatchback with a 1.6L SOHC engine and deluxe trim.

The car's name is formed from 'VAZ-index model name. The classic Fiat 124-derived models were known on the domestic market as Zhiguli (Жигули) until the late-1990s, when the name was dropped; thus, the 2104-2107 range, as well as 110-series, actually lack a model name. The restyled Sputnik range was renamed Samara, but the Niva and the Oka retained their names. By the 2000s (decade), the VAZ designation was dropped from market names in favour of Lada and simplified export naming conventions were adopted, so VAZ-2104 effectively became Lada 2104, VAZ-2110 became Lada 110, VAZ-2114 became Lada Samara hatchback or Lada 114 and so on, though model indices continue to be used in both technical and marketing materials.

The model names varied from market to market and as such should not be used except to indicate a certain export market. Instead, it is advisable to refer solely to the model number as these are the same for all markets.

Classic Zhiguli

Original

See also
 List of GAZ vehicles
 List of Moskvitch vehicles
 List of ZiL vehicles

References

AvtoVAZ
AvtoVAZ